Lisa Rose Apramian, also known as Dr. Lisa, is an Armenian-American psychologist and filmmaker most notable as the director, writer, and producer of the documentary film Not Bad for a Girl.

Career 
Apramian studied at the University of Southern California where she received a B.S. in psychology, a B.S. in Critical Gender Studies, and an M.S. and Ph.D. in Counseling Psychology and phenomenology.

Apramian served as a psychological consultant for the 1994 Rafal Zielinski film Fun which received two special Jury awards from the Sundance Film Festival.

See also
 List of female film and television directors

References

External links 
 
  Enlightened Sexuality Pilot Survey - Dr Lisa Apramian Ph.D. (2008)

Riot grrrl
Living people
University of Southern California alumni
American documentary film directors
American women writers
Year of birth missing (living people)
21st-century American women
American women documentary filmmakers